Cosima von Bonin (born 1962) is a German contemporary artist. von Bonin's practice features the use of sculptures, textiles, sound, film and performances. von Bonin draws inspiration from the intellectual, artistic, and musical culture of her neighborhood in Cologne, Germany, where she lives and works.

Early life
Cosima von Bonin was born in Mombasa, Kenya and raised in Austria. von Bonin graduated from the Hochschule für bildende Künste Hamburg (University of Fine Arts in Hamburg). As a student her first memorable work, in a collaboration with Josef Strau, occurred as she exhibited herself in a window display at a Hamburg showroom in 1990.

Career
One focus of von Bonin's artistic works is the relationship between works of art and the world of fashion, music and architecture. She often focuses on collective artistic production frequently including collaboration with other artists as well as parties, DJ sets, music performances and audio and video exhibitions. The exhibitions are of an ephemeral nature intended to reject the classical idea of the individual artistic genius.

Select solo exhibitions

Cosima von Bonin: Roger and Out, Museum of Contemporary Art, Los Angeles (2008)
The Fatigue Empire, Kunsthaus Bregenz (2010)
Cosima von Bonin, Mildred Lane Kemper Art Museum (2011)
Hippies use side door (2014-2015)

Select group exhibitions
Documenta 12 (2007)
Home Sweet Home, Deichtorhallen (1997)
First Graz Fan Fest (1995)
Glockengeschrei nach Deutz - das Beste aller Seiten (The Bell Screams Towards Deutz - the Best of all Sides) (1996)

Public collections
Bonin's art can be found in a number of public collections, including:

Museum of Modern Art
Stedelijk Museum Amsterdam
Museum of Contemporary Art, Los Angeles

See also
 List of German women artists

References

1962 births
Living people
German contemporary artists
German women artists